The Yungas manakin (Chiroxiphia boliviana) is a species of bird in the family Pipridae. It closely resembles the blue-backed manakin, but unlike that species it has dull dark red legs and is found in humid highland forests in the Yungas of southeastern Peru and Bolivia.

References

Yungas manakin
Birds of the Yungas
Yungas manakin
Taxonomy articles created by Polbot